In geometry, the metabiaugmented hexagonal prism is one of the Johnson solids. As the name suggests, it can be constructed by doubly augmenting a hexagonal prism by attaching square pyramids to two of its nonadjacent, nonparallel equatorial faces. Attaching the pyramids to opposite equatorial faces yields a parabiaugmented hexagonal prism. (The solid obtained by attaching pyramids to adjacent equatorial faces is not convex, and thus not a Johnson solid.)

See also 
 Hexagonal prism

External links
 

Johnson solids